Saint-Laurent-de-Mure is a commune in the Rhône department in eastern France. Saint-Laurent-de-Mure forms part of the communauté de communes (grouping of villages)  in the eastern Lyons area which support one another to provide improved services for inhabitants.

Location
Within an easy commute of the city centre, on the first/last exit before the toll road (péage), it is also close to the international airport, Lyon-Saint Exupéry Airport.

History
The town bears traces of occupation dating as far back as the Neolithic, as evidenced by the Recou Woods cupstone.

Ruins of a delphinal castle remain on the Escoffier farm, and its surrounding walls can be seen here and there in the old village.

The château has the peculiarity of having sewers at children's height, allowing those of the village to regularly enter. There are also ancient tombs in Saint-Laurent-de-Mure, at the place called Bois du Baron.

Population

Renovation
Renovation work on the local manor house has created an example of the modern French approach and attitudes to the use of older properties. The front façade has been renovated rather than restored, and at the rear of the building a glass-walled extension has been added to allow for expansion. The house forms the focal point of the local woods, which are often used by the local junior school for the kermesse and other activities.

Twin towns — sister cities
Saint-Laurent-de-Mure is twinned with:

  Chambave, Italy

See also
Communes of the Rhône department

References

Communes of Rhône (department)